El Palmar Integrated Management Natural Area (Área Natural de Manejo Integrado El Palmar) - not to be confused with El Palmar National Park in Argentina - is a protected area in Bolivia located in the Chuquisaca Department, Jaime Zudáñez Province.

External links 
 www.fundesnap.org / El Palmar Integrated Management Natural Area (Spanish)

Protected areas of Bolivia
Geography of Chuquisaca Department
Protected areas established in 1997